Kirsten Frances Oswald (born 21 December 1972) is a Scottish National Party (SNP) politician first elected as the Member of the UK Parliament (MP) for East Renfrewshire in 2015; she was unseated at the 2017 snap election but subsequently re-elected at the 2019 election. She served as the deputy leader of the SNP parliamentary party from 2020 to 2022.

In July 2020, Oswald became the SNP's deputy leader at Westminster, before announcing in December 2022 that she would be standing down from the position. She has been SNP Spokesperson for Women and Equalities since February 2021.

Early life and education

Oswald was born in Dundee to Helen and Ed Oswald. Her mother Helen, was Provost of Angus Council. She grew up in Carnoustie where she attended Carnoustie High School. She studied history at the University of Glasgow graduating with an MA(Hons) in 2005.

Political career
Oswald became active in the Scottish National Party during the 2014 Scottish independence referendum, serving on the committee of her local Women for Independence group where she was responsible for local food bank collections.

On 30 January 2015, it was announced that Oswald was selected as the SNP candidate for the East Renfrewshire constituency at the 2015 general election. During her campaign, she was criticised for sending letters to Conservative voters asking for their support to beat Labour. Oswald stated that her letters served to contrast voter values with negative campaign tactics from the Conservatives that focused on keeping the SNP out of power.

She won the seat with a majority of 3,718 votes, unseating the Leader of the Scottish Labour Party, Jim Murphy, who had held the seat since Labour's victory 18 years earlier; Murphy resigned from the Scottish Labour leadership on 13 June 2015.

At the 2017 general election, Oswald lost her seat to Paul Masterton of the Conservatives, who won with a majority of 4,712 votes.

In 2018 she was elected Chairman and Business Convener of the SNP, replacing Scottish Government Finance Secretary Derek Mackay.

She was selected by the SNP to contest the East Renfrewshire seat in the 2019 general election, where she was re-elected with a majority of 5,426 votes or 9.8%, larger than her 2015 majority.

On 7 July 2020, she was elected deputy leader of the SNP in the House of Commons, succeeding Kirsty Blackman. 

In May 2021, Oswald said that she fundamentally disagreed with her colleague Douglas Chapman on the assessment of support and financial information available to him in his role as party Treasurer. Chapman had stood down from this role in the wake of a probe regarding £600,000 'missing' independence campaign funds being investigated by Police Scotland.

Oswald has repeatedly spoken out about China's reported repression in the House of Commons. In September 2021, Uyghur leaders honoured her for her continued work on their cause, and the World Uyghur Congress publicly thanked her for her support.

In June 2022, Oswald's colleague, Patrick Grady, was found to have inappropriately touched a teenage member of SNP staff at Westminster and was suspended from the Commons. Grady's victim alleged that the "bullying" he received after he made the complaint was worse than the harassment itself, and emailed colleagues to say that he had "no faith that a meaningful change" would be made to the party's handling of such complaints. In July, Oswald emailed the victim to say that she "fully appreciated that this is a difficult time for you" but also threatened him with disciplinary action unless he decided to "cease and desist from sending such further emails with immediate effect". She continued: "Should you choose to continue to do so, despite the terms of this communication, then it is only fair to put you on notice that this could be treated as misconduct and make you subject to further action under a disciplinary process. It is, of course, very much hoped that will not be necessary."

On 2 December 2022, the day after Ian Blackford announced he would be stepping down from his role as SNP Westminster leader, Oswald announced that she would be stepping down as deputy Westminster leader as well. "It seems sensible to me that a new leader and new deputy pick up the baton," she said. "And [the party will] have my support to do that."

Personal life
Oswald  married Davinder Bedi since 2002; they have two sons. The family moved to East Renfrewshire in 2008. Bedi did not campaign for his wife during the 2015 election campaign, and joined Scottish Labour after the election.

Oswald was head of Human Resources at South Lanarkshire College from May 2002 to May 2015.

References

External links

Profile at www.snp.org

1972 births
21st-century Scottish women politicians
21st-century Scottish politicians
Alumni of the University of Glasgow
Female members of the Parliament of the United Kingdom for Scottish constituencies
Human resource management people
Living people
Members of the Parliament of the United Kingdom for Scottish constituencies
People educated at Carnoustie High School
Politicians from Dundee
Scottish National Party MPs
UK MPs 2015–2017
UK MPs 2019–present